John H. Mahan (July 22, 1898 – September 2, 1955) was an American track and field athlete who competed in the 1920 Summer Olympics. He was born in Gainesville, Texas.

Mahan a fullback and kicker on the national champion 1919 Texas A&M Aggies football team under head coach Dana X. Bible.

In 1920, he finished twelfth in the javelin throw competition.

References

External links

 

1898 births
1955 deaths
Texas A&M Aggies football players
American male javelin throwers
Olympic track and field athletes of the United States
Athletes (track and field) at the 1920 Summer Olympics